Gzenaya or Igzenayen is the name of a tribe in the mountainous Rif region in northern Morocco.

Etymology
The word Gzenaya comes from the Berber word "Igzenayen". Originally the tribe was known by the land of "Gzenaya" which means the land of beauty

the area is well known by its high mountains (Rif Mountains), huge valleys and rivers, green woods, and its healing water of Ain Hamra.

Gzenaya has an important place in the history of Morocco. it is the birthplace of many heroes ; as well as being the birth  tribe of Jaich ittahrir, the army of independence.

War with France

During the protectorate, the Gzenaya tribe defeated France in the “Triangle of Death”  (Aknoul, Boured, Tizi Ousli), in October 1921, for the country's independence and the end of the protectorate.

Geography
Geographically, the Igzenayen historical region extends over the modern Moroccan provinces of Taza, Al-Hoceima, Taounate, and possibly a portion of the Nador province.

The geography is characterized by its high mountains, some small fertile plains, and by a fresh Mediterranean climate.

Some notable towns and village of Gzennaya include:

 Tisliouine
 Tarra Tazegwaght
 Ait aissam
 Ait Mhend
 Ajdir
 Aknul (Icawiyen)
 Braret
 Buisri
 Burd
 Buankud
 Branda
 Dcar Azrou
 Taghirast
 Duaya
 Aarkub
 Kassita
 Ibakriyen
 Inehecen
 Ixewanen
 Ighbaben
 Iharkliyen
 Iharcliene
 Iharesen
 Ihdayen (Hadria)
 Ihrucen
 Ikabunen
 Ikarwan
 Inehnahen
 Ibuakbathen (sidi ali bourkba)
 Izarwalen
 Jbarna
 Tastit
 Tarmest
 Tbadiwien
 Tegzratin
 Tizi w-Asri
 Tizi n Dra
 Tizi ousli
 Asht Aissa
 Yarwahdud
 Douar Ifzarene (Ifzan)
 Douar tighza

References

Berber peoples and tribes
Rif